Elections to Liverpool Town Council were held on Wednesday 1 November 1847. One third of the council seats were up for election, the term of office of each councillor being three years.

Four of the sixteen wards were uncontested.

After the annual Council election on 1 November 1847, the Aldermanic election on 9 November 1847 and the four by-elections caused by four Councillors having been elected as Aldermen on 17 November 1847, the composition of the council was:

Election result

Ward results

* – Retiring Councillor seeking re-election

Abercromby

Castle Street

Everton

Exchange

Great George

Lime Street

North Toxteth

Pitt Street

Rodney Street

{{Election box candidate with party link|
  |party      = Conservative Party (UK)
  |candidate  = James Aspinall Tobin
  |votes      = ''295  |percentage = 63%  |change     = 
}}

St. Anne Street

St. Paul's

St. Peter's

Scotland

South Toxteth

Vauxhall

West Derby

Aldermanic Elections

On 9 November 1847, the term of office of eight aldermen who were elected on 9 November 1841 expired.

The following were elected as Aldermen by the council on 9 November 1847 for a term of office of six years.*''' – re-elected Alderman.

By-elections

No. 6, Castle Street, Wednesday 17 November 1847

Caused by the election of Councillor John Holmes (Reformer, Castle Street, elected 1 November 1847) as an Alderman on 9 November 1847.

No. 9, Great George, Wednesday 17 November 1847

Caused by the election of Councillor Joseph Cooper (Conservative, Great George, elected 1 November 1846) as an Alderman on 9 November 1847.

No. 11, Abercromby, Wednesday 17 November 1847

Caused by the election of Councillor James Procter (Conservative, Abercromby, elected 1 November 1847

No. 10, Rodney Street, Wednesday 17 November 1847

Caused by the election of Councillor John Nelson Wood (Conservative, Rodney Street, elected 1 November 1845) as an Alderman on 9 November 1847.

See also
Liverpool Town Council elections 1835 – 1879
Liverpool City Council elections 1880–present
Mayors and Lord Mayors 
of Liverpool 1207 to present
History of local government in England

References

1847
1847 English local elections
November 1847 events
1840s in Liverpool